Béatrice is a French feminine given name. Notable people with the name include:

 Béatrice Bonifassi (born c. 1971), French-born vocalist
 Béatrice Dalle (born 1964), French actress
 Béatrice de Camondo (1894–1944), French socialite and a Holocaust victim
 Béatrice de Planisoles, minor noble in the Comté de Foix in the late thirteenth and early fourteenth century
 Béatrice Descamps (born 1951), French politician and a member of the Senate of France
 Béatrice Ephrussi de Rothschild (1864-1934), French socialite
 Béatrice Farinacci, former French figure skater
 Béatrice Hess (born 1961 or 1962), French swimmer
 Béatrice Hiéronyme de Lorraine (1662–1738), member of the House of Lorraine
 Béatrice Knopf-Basson (born 1958), French sprint canoer
 Béatrice Lalinon Gbado, children's writer
 Béatrice Longuenesse, professor of philosophy at New York University
 Béatrice Martin, (born 1989), French-Canadian singer
 Béatrice Mouthon (born 1966), French athlete who competes in triathlon
 Béatrice Nirere, Rwandan politician who was convicted of genocide for her involvement in the 1994 Rwandan Genocide
 Béatrice of Albon (1161-1228), countess and dauphine in 1162 upon the death of her father Guigues V
 Princess Béatrice of Bourbon-Two Sicilies (born 1950) 
 Béatrice of Vermandois (c. 880–931), daughter of Herbert I, Count of Vermandois
 Béatrice Patrie (born 1957), French politician and Member of the European Parliament
 Béatrice Pavy (born 1958), member of the National Assembly of France
 Béatrice Picard (born 1929), Canadian actress
 Béatrice Poulot (fl. c. 2000), French singer
 Béatrice Romand (born 1952), French actress best known for her work with director Éric Rohmer
 Béatrice Schönberg (born 1953), French television journalist
 Béatrice Stöckli (died 2020), Swiss Christian missionary
 Béatrice Thomas, American-born German funk and soul singer
 Béatrice Vernaudon (born 1953), French politician

See also 
 Beatrice (given name)
 Béatrice et Bénédict, an opera in two acts by Hector Berlioz
 Béatrice, an opera in four acts by André Messager

French feminine given names